The Leader of the Opposition of the Republic of Mauritius is the Member of Parliament who leads the Official Opposition in Mauritius. The Leader of the Opposition is the leader of the largest political party in the National Assembly that is not in government.

This office is a constitutional one guaranteed by the laws of the country. The current officeholder becomes automatically 7th in the order of precedence. The current Leader of the Opposition is Xavier-Luc Duval who was appointed on March 4, 2021.

Overview

The political party or party alliance which wins the majority of seats in Parliament forms the government and its leader usually becomes the Prime Minister. The Prime Minister selects the members of the composition of the Cabinet from elected members of the Assembly, except for the Attorney General who may not be an elected member of the Assembly. The political party or alliance which has the second-largest majority forms the Official Opposition and its leader is normally nominated by the President of the Republic as the Leader of the Opposition.

According to Section 73 of the Constitution of Mauritius, there shall be a Leader of the Opposition who shall be appointed by the President, where the President has occasion to appoint a Leader of the Opposition, he shall in his own deliberate judgment appoint –

List of leaders of the opposition

Parties

See also

 Prime Minister of Mauritius
 Deputy Prime Minister of Mauritius
 Vice Prime Minister of Mauritius
 Government of Mauritius

References

Main|Mauritius
Lists of political office-holders in Mauritius
Mauritius